The 1993 Tipperary Senior Hurling Championship was the 103rd staging of the Tipperary Senior Hurling Championship since its establishment by the Tipperary County Board in 1887. The championship began on 12 September 1993 and ended on 10 October 1993.

Toomevara were the defending champions.

On 10 October 1993, Toomevara won the championship after a 1-14 to 1-13 defeat of Nenagh Éire Óg in the final at Semple Stadium. It was their 12th championship title overall and their second title in succession.

Sponsorship

For the first time ever, the Tipperary Senior Hurling Championship was sponsored. The sponsors were Nenagh Co-Op and the amount of the sponsorship, which was "substantial" according to county chairman Michael Maguire, wasn't revealed.

Qualification

Results

Quarter-finals

Semi-finals

Final

Championship statistics

Top scorers

Top scorers overall

Top scorers in a single game

References

External link

 Nenagh Co-op 1993 County Senior Hurling Championship

Tipperary
Tipperary Senior Hurling Championship